The Muppet Movie: Original Soundtrack Recording is the soundtrack album from the 1979 film, The Muppet Movie, featuring the songs and select score written by Paul Williams and Kenneth Ascher. Originally released on LP by Atlantic Records in North America and by CBS internationally, the album reached No. 32 on the Billboard 200, and was certified Gold by the Recording Industry Association of America. The soundtrack won the Grammy Award for Best Children's Album in 1980 and was also nominated for the Grammy Award for Best Score Soundtrack for Visual Media, the Golden Globe for Best Original Song, and two Academy Awards; Best Adaptation Score for the overall album and Best Original Song for "Rainbow Connection", which reached No. 25 on the Billboard Hot 100.

After its initial release, the soundtrack album had subsequent CD reissues by Jim Henson Records in 1993 and by Walt Disney Records on August 13, 2013. Disney's reissue was digitally remastered, featured liner notes by Williams, and marked the first time the soundtrack was available in print in over 20 years. The album was reissued on vinyl by Walt Disney Records in partnership with Iam8bit and The Muppets Studio on April 27, 2022.

Track listing

Personnel
Guitars: Art Munson, Ernie Corallo, Anthony Berg
Keyboards: Kenny Ascher, David Garland, Michael Melvoin, Randy Kerber
Drums: Gary Mallaber, James Gordon
Percussion: Mark Stevens, Alan Estes
Bass: Colin Cameron, Reinhold Press
Saxophone: David Garland
Harmonica: Tommy Morgan

Charts and certifications

Charts

Certifications

Footnotes

References

External links
 "Rainbows, frogs, dogs and The Muppet Movie soundtrack at 40", Pop Culture Happy Hour, NPR, 2019

1979 soundtrack albums
Atlantic Records soundtracks
CBS Records soundtracks
Comedy film soundtracks
Disney film soundtracks
Grammy Award for Best Musical Album for Children
The Muppets albums
Musical film soundtracks
Paul Williams (songwriter) albums
Record Store Day releases
Walt Disney Records soundtracks